Madan Mohan College is a public college in Sylhet. It was established in 1940. Many notable people have completed their intermediate education from this college.

History
Madan Mohan College was established by Mohini Mohan Das, Jugendra Mohan Das and Prafulla Mohan Das in memory of their father Madan Mohan Das on 26 January 1940. Its founder principal was Pramod Chandra Goswamee.

Academic departments

Faculty of Science
 Department of Chemistry
 Department of Physics
 Department of Mathematics
 Department of Statistics
 Department of ICT

Faculty of Business Studies 
 Department of Management
 Department of Accounting                                                                                             
 Department of Finance and Banking

Faculty of Social Science 
 Department of Economics
 Department of Political Science
 Department of Development Studies

Faculty of Biological Science
 Department of Botany
 Department of Zoology

Faculty of Arts
 Department of Bengali
 Department of English
 Department of Islamic Studies
 Department of Philosophy
 Department of Islamic History & Culture

Extracurricular activities
Madan Mohan College is very notable for its affiliation with Bangladesh National Cadet Corps and Bangladesh Scouts. Students are also participating cultural activities regularly.

References

External links
 

Colleges affiliated to National University, Bangladesh
Colleges in Sylhet District
Universities and colleges in Sylhet District
Educational institutions established in 1940
1940 establishments in India
Education in Sylhet